Lou Yi-an is a Taiwanese writer and director devoted to both the cinema and television industry. He is known for his dark humor, character-driven intricate story lines. He often portrays the working class and the migrants in a context of social and racial discrimination. 

He got noticed in 2006 when he won the Best Director in a Miniseries award from the 41st Golden Bell Awards in 2006. Later in 2007 he won, together with Singing Chen the Best Original Screenplay award at the 44th Golden Horse Awards. Several of Lou's films also include Chen's work, such as the short Waterfront Villa Bonita (2007), Bundled (2000), God Man Dog (2007) and Lou's first long-feature as a director A Place of One's Own (2009) that focused on poor people living in New Taipei City.  

In 2010, he wrote A gloomy Salad Day, a TV series that talk about teenage-hood.   

In 2013, Lou was commissioned by the Hakka Television Service to make The Losers. Lou drew inspiration for the project from the Hakka band Labor Exchange, specifically the album Night March of the Chrysanthemums. the film touched on Taiwanese culture, social and racial issues caused by class and age gaps. It portrayed rural life in Meinong, Kaohsiung. Due to The Losers heavy subject matter, Lou was advised not to theatrically release it. As a result, the film was shown for one week only at the Spot Huashan Cinema in Taipei. In April 2016, Lou traveled to London to attend a screening of The Losers at SOAS, University of London.  

In 2015, he directed and co-wrote White Lies, Black Lies, different from the previous works, it focus on the psychological aftermath of murders committed in 1960s Wanhua District of Taipei. It is Lou Yi-an's first successfully commercial big screen movie. 

In 2018, he then returned to television with the TV series Roseki which is also well appraised by the public and confirmed his renown in Taiwan. Roseki is a 14 episodes long drama that relates the life of the famous Taipei writer and singer Lu Ho-juo during the Japanese colonization, alternating between the singer's stage life and personal life. The show was premiered on Hakka TV.

In 2021 he worked as a director and screenwriter on the TV series Heaven on the 4th Floor as well as Goddamned Asura for which he earned a Best Screenplay award at the Taipei Film Festival as a Best original screenplay nomination at the Taiwanese Golden Horse Film Festival.

Filmography

Film

Television

Short Film

Awards and Nominations

References

External links

Living people
Taiwanese film directors
Taiwanese television directors
Year of birth missing (living people)